Anuj Batra is a research electrical engineer at Texas Instruments, specializing in ultrawideband wireless technology.

He holds a BS in electrical engineering from Cornell University, an MS in electrical engineering from Stanford University, and a Ph.D. in electrical engineering from Georgia Tech. In 2004, he was recognized as a "young innovator" by inclusion in the MIT Technology Review's "TR100" list.

References

Living people
Year of birth missing (living people)
Electrical engineers
Georgia Tech alumni
Cornell University College of Engineering alumni
Stanford University School of Engineering alumni
American electrical engineers